St Joseph's Church is a Roman Catholic parish church in Maidenhead, Berkshire, England. It was built in 1884 and designed by Leonard Stokes in the Gothic Revival style. It is located on the Cookham Road north of the town centre. It is a Grade II listed building and William Wilberforce junior played a role in its foundation.

History

Construction
In 1850, William Wilberforce junior, the son of William Wilberforce, converted to Catholicism. In 1867, he established a mission in Maidenhead by installing a chapel in a property at St Ives Place. In 1871, a Catholic school began in the area. In 1879, the site for the current church was bought. The architect Leonard Stokes was commissioned to design the church. In August 1884, construction on the church started. The total cost of building the church, school and presbytery was £6,025 and the church itself was £3,018. In December 1884, the church was opened.

Developments
From 1913 to 1914, the church was extended. The sanctuary, sacristy, transepts and the church tower were added. Leonard Stokes designed the additions, but to new designs. In 1963, plans were made to further extend the church. In 1965, construction of the extension to the west of the church was completed. The architect was Max G. Cross of the architectural firm Geens Cross & Sims from Bournemouth and the builders were Halfacre & Young. In 1985, the old presbytery was replaced by a new house and the parish centre was opened. The parish centre was designed by Daniel Lelliott Krauze. From 2004 to 2006, repairs were made to the church.

Parish
St Joseph's Church is a parish with St Elizabeth's Church in Cookham. There are four Sunday Masses at St Joseph's Church at 6:30pm on Saturday and at 8:00am, 9:15am and 11:00am on Sunday.

See also
 Roman Catholic Diocese of Portsmouth

References

External links
 

Places of worship in Maidenhead
Roman Catholic churches in Berkshire
Grade II listed churches in Berkshire
Grade II listed Roman Catholic churches in England
Roman Catholic churches completed in 1884
1867 establishments in England
Religious organizations established in 1867
Gothic Revival church buildings in England
Gothic Revival architecture in Berkshire
19th-century Roman Catholic church buildings in the United Kingdom